The Kenyah people are an indigenous, Austronesian-speaking people of Borneo, living in the remote Baram Lio Matoh, Long Selaan, Long Moh, Long Anap, Long Mekaba, Long Jeeh, Long Belaong, Long San, Long Silat, Long Tungan, Data Kakus, Data Surau, Data Senap, Long Dungan, Long Busang, Long Beyak, Tubau, Bintulu, Miri, Apau Koyan resettlement for Bakun Dam, Long Bulan, Long Jawe, Dangang, Long Bangan, Long Sah B(Uma Kelep), Long Urun, Sambop Long Semutut, Long Tebulang, Long Lawen, Long Unan and Belaga regions in Sarawak, Malaysia and the remote Apau Kayan, Bahau (Bau), Benua Lama, Benua Baru and Mahakam regions in North Kalimantan and East Kalimantan, Indonesia.

Kenyah people are divided into various lepo'/lebo' (tribes/clans) including the Uma Bakah, Lepo Anan, Lepo Tau, Lepu Jalan, Lepo' Tepu, Uma Kelep(Lebuq Timai), Uma Ujok, Uma Pawa', Seping, Sebop, Badeng, Jamok, Lepo Agak, Bakung (Long Singut), Uma Kulit, Uma Alim, Lebuq Timai, Uma Lasan, Lepo Ma-ut, Sambop, Lepo Ke', Lepo Ngao, Ngurek, Long Ulai, Long Tikan, Long Sabatu, Lepo Ga, Lepo Dikan, Lepo' Bem, Lepo' Embo' and Lepo Pua.

Culture and economy 

The Kenyah people, traditionally being swidden agriculturalists and living in longhouses (uma dado'''), is an umbrella term for over 40 sub-groups that mostly share common migration histories, customs, and related dialects. Kenyah people lived in longhouses a small communities. Each longhouse consists of families who choose their own leader (headman). When they have an event or celebration such as harvest festival, they will normally use the longhouse verandah (oseh bi'o) to gather and deliver speeches to guide their youngsters. Normally this harvest festival celebration (tau bio Ramay o o Ajau, pelepek uman) is a major festival because most of them are still farmers.

Kenyah people are very creative. They compose their popular songs and melody such as Lan e Tuyang, Kendau bimbin, Ilu Kenyah Kua Lo Te'a, Pabat Pibui, Atek Lan, and Leleng Oyau Along Leleng. Popular traditional Kenyah musical instruments are such as jatung utang (wooden xylophone), sampe (a type of guitar), sampe bio (single-stringed bass), lutong (a four- to six-string bamboo tube zither) and keringut (nose flute).

 Religion 

Christianity is the predominant religion of Kenyah people, with the majority belonging to the Evangelical Protestanism. Before the arrival of Christian missionaries, the Kenyah people practice a traditional form of animism called 'Adat Pu'un'. During the initial introduction of Christianity by Christian & Missionary Alliance and Borneo Evangelical Mission, traditional beliefs and practices were revitalized and this form was called 'Bungan Malan Peselong Luan' movement. Today, there are only a small number of Kenyah people who still practice the Bungan faith. It is believed that a person will ascend to Alo Malau (seven heavens) with their ancestors (tepun) after death.

 Population 
Statistical figures, based on the Indonesian and Malaysian national censuses collected in 2000, recorded a total of 44,350 Kenyah people in East Kalimantan, Indonesia and 24,906 in Sarawak, Malaysia.

 Sub-ethnic groups 
The Kenyah people are also divided into various sub-ethnic groups such as:-
Kenyah Badeng or Madang
Kenyah Bakung
Kenyah Jamok
Kenyah Lepo' Abong
Kenyah Lepo' Aga
Kenyah Lepo' Anan
Kenyah Lepo' Bam
Kenyah Lepo' Gah
Kenyah Lepo' Jalan
Kenyah Lepo' Ke'
Kenyah Lepo' Kulit
Kenyah Lepo' Maut
Kenyah Lepo' Sawa'
Kenyah Lepo' Tau'
Kenyah Lepo' Tepu
Kenyah Lepo' Timai
Kenyah Long Ulai
Kenyah Long Sebatu
Kenyah Long Belukun
Kenyah Long Tikan
Kenyah Uma' Bangan
Kenyah Uma' Baka
Kenyah Uma' Kelep
Kenyah Uma' Lasan
Kenyah Uma' Lung
Kenyah Uma' Pawa'
Kenyah Uma' Sambop
Kenyah Uma' Tukung
Kenyah Seping

 Origins 

The Usun Apau (aka Usun Apo) plateau (in the Plieran River valley) or Apo Kayan Highlands (a remote forested plateau in Malaysian and Indonesian border) in the present-day Indonesian province of North Kalimantan and Malaysia's Sarawak is believed by the Kenyah people to be their place of origin; which was the largest concentration site of Kenyah populations between the late 19th century to the early 1980s.

 Languages 
The Kenyah languages are a small family of Austronesian languages. Their language is called Kenyah.

Folk songs
 Leleng-Leleng
 Leleng
 Ake' Mimbin Iko' Tuyang
 Pabat Pibui
 Daleh Lenca dalem bada
 Ayen Palo boka tai mutu leto

Notable people
 Francisca Luhong James - Miss Universe Malaysia 2020 and a part-time model. She is of mixed Kayan, Kenyah and Iban lineage.
Yurnalis Ngayoh, Governor east Kalimantan
 Jacob Dungau Sagan, former Member of the Malaysian Parliament, former Deputy Minister of International Trade and Industry of Malaysia, and member and Senior Vice-President of the Sarawak Progressive Democratic Party (SPDP)
 Joseph Kalang Tie, professional footballer and Malaysia National Team representative. He hails from Long Ikang, Baram and is of Kenyah-Malaysian Chinese parentage.
 Larissa Ping Liew, Miss World Malaysia 2018. She is of Malaysian Chinese-Kenyah parentage.

 Lerby Eliandry

See also
 View of the tiger

References

 Further reading 
Into the Art of Borneo: The Kenyah-Kayan Tradition
Encyclopædia Britannica: KayahPeople of the same heart: The social world of the Kenyah Badeng''. Rita Armstrong, 1991. PhD Thesis, Dept of Anthropology, University of Sydney

External links 
 
 United Nations University's Our World 2.0 "Forbidden forest of the Dayak people" Digital Video: In Setulang village, near the Malay-Indonesian border, lives the "Oma'lung" tribe — a particular sub-group of Kenyah Dayak, East Kalimantan, Indonesia, on the island of Borneo
 Kaipuleohone's Robert Blust collection includes written notes on many different varieties of Kenyah.

 
Ethnic groups in Indonesia
Dayak people